Charles Clark Stockley (November 6, 1819 – April 20, 1901) was an American farmer and politician from Georgetown, in Sussex County, Delaware. He was a member of the Democratic Party, who served in the Delaware General Assembly and as Governor of Delaware.

Early life and family
Stockley was born near Georgetown, Delaware, son of Jehu and Hannah Rodney Kollock Stockley. Returning from school in Philadelphia in 1839, he taught school for seven years and then opened a general store in Millsboro, Delaware. His primary occupation was farming the extensive real estate he owned. Eventually he became one of the major peach growers in eastern Sussex County. Stockley married Ellen Anderson in 1859, and they had one child, Hannah. They lived on Cedar Lane (State Rd 318) southeast of Georgetown, near the present-day airport, and were members of St. Paul's Episcopal Church.

Professional and political career
Stockley was Sussex County Treasurer and in 1856 became Sussex County Sheriff. Elected to the state senate, he served in the 1873/74 session and 1875/76 session. In the last session he was the Speaker. Nearly eight years later the Democrats recruited him as their candidate for governor. After defeating Albert Curry of Greenwood, the Republican candidate, he served as governor from January 16, 1883 until January 18, 1887.

The majority Democratic Party still described itself as, “the White Man’s Party”, and still promoted thinking that could criticize African American voting rights, as an “insane policy of investing an ignorant and inferior race with the sacred rights of the ballot.” Nevertheless, now twenty years after the Civil War, the first stirrings of tolerance were heard. Stockley, on his retirement, noted that “Our colored citizens are improving their advantages by laudable efforts to acquire homes for themselves and education for their children. The prejudice against their enfranchisement is fast disappearing, and I trust will soon pass away forever.

Death and legacy
Stockley died at his home and is buried in the St. Paul's Episcopal Churchyard at Georgetown.

The Stockely Center, a facility of the Delaware Department of Health and Social Services, is named in his honor because of his early advocacy of services for the "feebly-minded."

Almanac
Elections are held the first Tuesday after November 1. Members of the Delaware General Assembly took office the first Tuesday of January. State senators have a four-year term. The governor takes office the third Tuesday of January and has a four-year term.

References

Images
Hall of Governors Portrait Gallery Portrait courtesy of Historical and Cultural Affairs, Dover.

External links
Biographical Directory of the Governors of the United States
Delaware’s Governors

The Political Graveyard

Places with more information
Delaware Historical Society; website; 505 North Market Street, Wilmington, Delaware 19801; (302) 655-7161
University of Delaware; Library website; 181 South College Avenue, Newark, Delaware 19717; (302) 831-2965

1819 births
1901 deaths
Methodists from Delaware
People from Georgetown, Delaware
Farmers from Delaware
Democratic Party Delaware state senators
Democratic Party governors of Delaware
Burials in Sussex County, Delaware
Delaware sheriffs